Wanaparthy Assembly constituency

Mandals
The Assembly Constituency presently comprises the following Mandals:

Election results

Telangana Legislative Assembly election, 2018

Members of Legislative Assembly

See also
 List of constituencies of Telangana Legislative Assembly

References

Assembly constituencies of Telangana
Mahbubnagar district
Constituencies established in 1952
1952 establishments in India